This is a list of notable graphic designers.

A–C

 Reza Abedini
 Otl Aicher
 Alan Aldridge
 John Alvin
 Gail Anderson
 Jeff Arwadi
 Roberto Baldazzini
 Jan Balet
 Marian Bantjes
 Noma Bar
 Jonathan Barnbrook
 Saul Bass
 Herbert Bayer
 Harry Beck
 John Bielenberg
 Michael Bierut
 Giambattista Bodoni
 Irma Boom
 Sheila Levrant de Bretteville
 Alexey Brodovitch
 Neville Brody
 Robert Brownjohn
 Dick Bruna
 Peter Buchanan-Smith
 Jon Burgerman
 Margaret Calvert
 Eric Carle
 David Carson
 Jacqueline Casey
 William Caslon
 Urso Chappell
 Elaine Lustig Cohen
 Vincent Connare
 Muriel Cooper
 Wim Crouwel
 Stanisław Czerski

D–F 

 Stanley Donwood
 Aaron Draplin
 Charles and Ray Eames
 Tom Eckersley
 Heinz Edelmann
 Siavash Fani
 Edward Fella
 Pablo Ferro
 Friedrich Kurt Fiedler
 Louise Fili
 Vittorio Fiorucci
 Clifton Firth
 Alan Fletcher
 Janet Froelich
 Adrian Frutiger
 Shigeo Fukuda

G–I 

 Ken Garland
 Tom Geismar
 Eric Gill
 Milton Glaser
 Denise Gonzales Crisp
 April Greiman
 Catrin G. Grosse
 Rudolf Grüttner
 Bugra Gulsoy
 Shekhar Gurera
 Dave Halili
 Baron Barrymore Halpenny
 Jessica Helfand
 Steven Heller
 Fons Hickmann
 Jon Hicks
 Jessica Hische
 Armin Hofmann
 Julian House
 Max Huber
 Hans Hulsbosch
 Angus Hyland
 Mirko Ilić
 Breuk Iversen

J–L 

 Tariq Jakobsen
 Tibor Kalman
 Susan Kare
 Ruth Kedar
 Jeffery Keedy
 Chip Kidd
 Jock Kinneir
 Barbara Kruger
 Nedim Kufi
 Walter Landor
 Poul Lange
 Zuzana Licko
 John Lloyd
 Herb Lubalin
 Ellen Lupton

M–O 

 John Maeda
 O'Plérou
 Martin Majoor
 Aldus Manutius
 Oscar Mariné
 Bruce Mau
 Katherine McCoy
 Dave McKean
 Philip B. Meggs
 Bruce Mau
 Debbie Millman
 Ron Miriello
 László Moholy-Nagy
 Morteza Momayez
 Aries Moross
 William Morris
 Josef Müller-Brockmann
 Bruno Munari
 Erik Nitsche
 Wally Olins
 Vaughan Oliver
 István Orosz

P–S 

 Robert L. Peters
 Clive Piercy
 Leif Podhajsky
 Soundarya Rajinikanth
 Nadhim Ramzi
 Paul Rand
 Satyajit Ray
 Brandon Rike
 Mikhail Rojter
 Tina Roth-Eisenberg
 Dolly Rudeman
 Emil Ruder
 Mehdi Saeedi
 Stefan Sagmeister
 Louise Sandhaus
 Peter Saville
 Jan Sawka
 Paula Scher
 Ghobad Shiva
 Bonnie Siegler
 Christopher Simmons
 Erik Spiekermann
 Hugh Syme

T–V 

 Storm Thorgerson
 Jake Tilson
 Ivana Tomljenović-Meller
 Jan Tschichold
 Carol Twombly
 Rudy VanderLans
 James Victore
 Massimo Vignelli

W–Z 

 Jurek Wajdowicz
 Jessica Walsh
 Brian Webb
 Wolfgang Weingart
 Lynda Weinman
 Bob West
 Lorraine Wild
 Michael Wolff
 Pilar Zeta

See also

 List of lists of artists by nationality 
 List of Polish Graphic Designers

References 

Graphic design